Tura may refer to the following people
Given name
Tura Satana (1938–2011), American actress and former exotic dancer

Surname
Agnolo di Tura, a 14th-century Italian chronicler 
Cosimo Tura (c. 1430–1495), Italian painter
Eshetu Tura (born 1950), Ethiopian long-distance runner
Jordi Solé Tura (1930–2009), Spanish politician
Montserrat Tura (born 1954), Spanish politician
Tai Tura (born 1949), Cook Islands politician 
Will Tura (born 1940), Belgian singer

Catalan-language surnames